The Leroy R. Willard House, also known as Willard Mansion, is located in Marshalltown, Iowa. The house was built in 1910 for Leroy R Willard and has been listed on the National Register of Historic Places since 1976.

History 
LeRoy Randall Willard (1 July 1864 - 2 October 1917) was owner of the Marshall Oil Company. The home was designed by Charles Eckman using Edwardian Georgian architectural styles.

References

Houses completed in 1910
Georgian Revival architecture in Iowa
WIlliard
Buildings and structures in Marshalltown, Iowa
Houses on the National Register of Historic Places in Iowa
National Register of Historic Places in Marshall County, Iowa